The Camptown Historic District, also known as the La Mott Historic District and Camp William Penn, is a national historic district located in La Mott, Pennsylvania. It is well known for the residence of famous abolitionist and suffragette Lucretia Mott. It was also a stop on the Underground Railroad. It played a crucial role in the Civil War; from 1863 to 1865, it housed Camp William Penn, a military training post for African-American soldiers. Following the war, many of the soldiers bought homes in the area. The area was said to be named "Camptown," but, since there was already another community in Pennsylvania that used that name, the name "La Mott" was chosen when the post office was established in 1885. The district covers 26 acres, and includes 35 contributing buildings.

The district was listed in the National Register of Historic Places in 1985.

References

External links
 Camptown Historic Site Profile

Historic districts on the National Register of Historic Places in Pennsylvania
Gothic Revival architecture in Pennsylvania
Italianate architecture in Pennsylvania
Historic districts in Montgomery County, Pennsylvania
Cheltenham Township, Pennsylvania
National Register of Historic Places in Montgomery County, Pennsylvania